Montford may refer to:

People with the surname 
 Andrew Montford, English writer and editor who maintains the Bishop Hill blog
 Arthur Montford (1929–2014), Scottish television sports journalist
 Bill Montford (born 1947), member of the Florida Senate
 Edgar Montford (1865–1940), Welsh footballer
 Harry Montford (1863–1942), Welsh footballer
 Joe Montford (born 1970), American footballer
 John T. Montford (born 1943), American businessman and politician
 Paul Raphael Montford (1868–1938), English-born Australian sculptor
 Simon de Montford (executed 1495), English nobleman
 Susan Montford, Scottish film director, screenwriter, and producer

People with the given name 

 Montford Johnson (1843–1896), Chickasaw cattleman
 Montford McGehee (1822–1895), American lawyer, farmer and politician in North Carolina
 Montford Scott (executed 1591), English Roman Catholic priest and martyr
 Montford George Southall (1907–1993), British Olympic cyclist known as George Southall

Other uses 
Montford, Shropshire, village and parish in England
HMS Montford, patrol boat of the Royal Navy and Nigerian Navy between 1957 and 1967

See also
Montford, North Carolina
Montford Point, North Carolina
Montfort (disambiguation)